Thomas Farrell (1887 – 1 July 1916) was an English professional footballer who played in the Football League for Manchester City as an inside left. He also played in the Scottish League for Airdrieonians.

Personal life 
Farrell was married with three children. He enlisted as a private in the Lancashire Fusiliers soon after the outbreak of the First World War in 1914. Farrell was posted to the 1st Battalion serving at Gallipoli in July 1915 and was evacuated in January 1916. Now a corporal, Farrell died in the Fusiliers' attack on the Hawthorn Ridge Redoubt on the first day of the Somme. A mine was detonated in the redoubt at 7:20 am and supporting infantry attacked the redoubt at around 7:30, but most were killed by machine-gun fire, including Farrell. He was buried in Auchonvillers Military Cemetery.

Career statistics

References

1887 births
1916 deaths
People from Newton-le-Willows
English footballers
English Football League players
Association football inside forwards
Arsenal F.C. players
Manchester City F.C. players
British Army personnel of World War I
Lancashire Fusiliers soldiers
British military personnel killed in the Battle of the Somme
Airdrieonians F.C. (1878) players
Scottish Football League players
Eccles United F.C. players
Military personnel from Merseyside
Footballers from Merseyside